The buccal  branches of the facial nerve (infraorbital branches), are of larger size than the rest of the branches, pass horizontally forward to be distributed below the orbit and around the mouth.

Branches
The superficial branches run beneath the skin and above the superficial muscles of the face, which they supply: some are distributed to the procerus, joining at the medial angle of the orbit with the infratrochlear and nasociliary branches of the ophthalmic.

The deep branches pass beneath the zygomaticus and the quadratus labii superioris, supplying them and forming an infraorbital plexus with the infraorbital branch of the maxillary nerve. These branches also supply the small muscles of the nose.

The lower deep branches supply the buccinator and orbicularis oris, and join with filaments of the buccinator branch of the mandibular nerve.

Muscles of facial expression

The facial nerve innervates the muscles of facial expression. The buccal branch supplies these muscles

Testing the nerve
• Puff up cheeks (buccinator)

i. Tap with finger over each cheek to detect ease of air expulsion on the affected side

• Smile and show teeth (orbicularis oris)

See also
 Buccal nerve

Additional images

References

External links
  - "Branches of Facial Nerve (CN VII)"
 
 
 https://web.archive.org/web/20080921093026/http://www.dartmouth.edu/~humananatomy/figures/chapter_47/47-5.HTM

Facial nerve